The Parks P-2, powered by a 150 hp Axelson-Floco B engine, was a biplane designed and built at the Parks Air College in the United States circa 1929. A change in engine type to the Wright J-6 resulted in the Parks P-2A, which was ultimately marketed as the Ryan Speedster after rights were bought by the Ryan company.

The Parks P-2A became the "hero" of books by author Richard Bach who also owned an example. The college quickly left the manufacturing business, selling the P-2A rights to Ryan as the Ryan Speedster, and later the Hammond 100.

Notes

References

1920s United States experimental aircraft
Single-engined tractor aircraft
Biplanes
Aircraft first flown in 1929